Robert Haas may refer to:

Robert Haas (musicologist) (1886–1960), Austrian musicologist
Robert Haas (calligrapher) (1898–1997), American calligrapher, typographer, photographer and book designer
Robert Haas (clergyman), German clergyman and ecumenist
Robert C. Haas, American law enforcement official in Cambridge, Massachusetts
Robert M. Haas (1889–1962), American art director
Bob Haas (born 1942), owner and executive of Levi Strauss & Co
Robert Haas (investor) (1947–2021), American investor, photographer and motorcycle collector 
Robert Z. Haas, American vinter of the Tablas Creek Vineyard

See also
Robert Hass (born 1941), poet
Robert Bernard Hass